Homole u Panny (until 1991 Homole) is a municipality and village in Ústí nad Labem District in the Ústí nad Labem Region of the Czech Republic. It has about 400 inhabitants.

Administrative parts
Villages of Babiny II, Bláhov, Byňov, Doubravice, Haslice, Lhota pod Pannou, Nová Ves u Pláně and Suletice are administrative parts of Homole u Panny.

References

Villages in Ústí nad Labem District